Biddenden was a railway station on the Kent and East Sussex Railway which closed in 1954.

As of 2014 the station building has been converted to a private house ("The Old Station") with parts of the platforms still clearly visible. The station is sited on the northern edge of the village on the A274 North Street/Headcorn Road.

Present day

References

External links
 Biddenden station at Disused-Stations.org.uk
 Biddenden station on navigable 1940 O. S. map

Disused railway stations in Kent
Former Kent and East Sussex Railway stations
Railway stations in Great Britain opened in 1905
Railway stations in Great Britain closed in 1954
1905 establishments in England
1954 disestablishments in England